The mayor of Ottawa is head of the executive branch of the Ottawa City Council. The mayor is elected alongside the city council every four years on the fourth Monday of October; there are no term limits. While in office, mayors are styled His/Her Worship. Mark Sutcliffe has served as the 59th and current mayor of Ottawa since taking office on November 15, 2022, following the 2022 municipal election.

The following is a list of mayors of Ottawa. Until 1854, Ottawa was known as Bytown. Over the course of Ottawa's history, the borders of the municipality have greatly expanded through annexations. This most recently occurred in 2001 when a number of neighbouring communities were amalgamated with Ottawa.

Bytown 
1847 – John Scott
1848 – John Bower Lewis
1849 – Robert Hervey 
1850 – John Scott
1851 – Charles Sparrow
1852 – Richard William Scott 
1853 – Joseph-Balsora Turgeon 
1854 – Henry J. Friel

Ottawa, pre-amalgamation (1855–2001) 
1855–1857 – John Bower Lewis 
1858–1859 – Edward McGillivray
1860–1862 – Alexander Workman 
1863 – ? – Henry J. Friel
1864–1866 – Moss Kent Dickinson 
1867 – Robert Lyon 
1868–1869 – Henry J. Friel
1870–1871 – John Rochester 
1872–1873 – Eugène Martineau
1874–1875 – John Peter Featherston 
1876 – G. B. Lyon-Fellowes
1877 – William Henry Waller
1878 – Chauncey Ward Bangs 
1879–1881 – Charles Herbert Mackintosh
1882–1883 – Pierre St. Jean, M.D. 
1884 – Charles Thornton Bate
1885–1886 – Francis McDougal 
1887–1888 – McLeod Stewart 
1889–1890 – Jacob Erratt 
1891 – Thomas Birkett
1892–1893 – Olivier Durocher 
1894 – George Cox 
1895–1896 – William Borthwick 
1897–1898 – Samuel Bingham 
1899–1900 – Thomas Payment 
1901 – William Dowler Morris 
1901 – James Davidson 
1902–1903 – Fred Cook 
1904–1906 – James A. Ellis
1906 – Robert A. Hastey 
1907–1908 – D'Arcy Scott 
1908 – Napoleon Champagne
1909–1912 – Charles Hopewell 
1912 – Edward H. Hinchey
1913 – James A. Ellis 
1914 – Taylor McVeity
1915–1916 – Nelson D. Porter 
1917–1920 – Harold Fisher 
1921–1923 – Frank H. Plant
1924 – Henry Watters
1924 – Napoléon Champagne
1925–1927 – John P. Balharrie
1928–1929 – Arthur Ellis 
1930 – Frank H. Plant
1931–1933 – John J. Allen 
1934–1935 – Patrick Nolan 
1936–1948 – J.E. Stanley Lewis  
1949–1950 – E.A. Bourque 
1951 – Grenville Goodwin
1951–1956 – Charlotte Whitton
1957–1960 – George H. Nelms 
1961–1964 – Charlotte Whitton
1965–1969 – Donald Bartlett Reid 
1970–1972 – Kenneth H. Fogarty, Q.C. 
1972–1974 – Pierre Benoit 
1975–1978 – Lorry Greenberg 
1978–1985 – Marion Dewar 
1985–1991 – James A. Durrell 
1991 – Marc Laviolette 
1991–1997 – Jacquelin Holzman
1997–2000 – Jim Watson
2000–2001 – Allan Higdon

Amalgamation 
When the city of Ottawa amalgamated in 2001, these were the mayors of the municipalities that amalgamated:

Chair of the Regional Municipality of Ottawa-Carleton: Bob Chiarelli
Ottawa: Allan Higdon (acting)
Gloucester: Claudette Cain
Kanata: Merle Nicholds
Nepean: Mary Pitt
Vanier: Guy Cousineau
Cumberland: Gerry Lalonde (acting)
Goulbourn: Janet Stavinga
Osgoode: Doug Thompson
Rideau: Glenn Brooks
West Carleton: Dwight Eastman
Rockcliffe Park: Patrick J. Murray

Since amalgamation (2001–present) 
 Bob Chiarelli, 2001–2006
 Larry O'Brien, 2006–2010
 Michel Bellemare, 2 May – 8 July 2009 (acting)
 Doug Thompson, 8 July – 6 August 2009 (acting) 
 Jim Watson, 2010–2022
 Mark Sutcliffe, 2022

Note: Bellemare and Thompson served as acting mayor during O'Brien's leave of absence, due to criminal charges before the court.

Notes

See also 

 List of Ottawa municipal elections
 Mayors of Osgoode Township

1847 establishments in Canada
Ottawa
Mayors